Lepidostemon is a genus of flowering plants belonging to the family Brassicaceae.

Its native range is Himalaya to Tibet.

Species:

Lepidostemon everestianus 
Lepidostemon glaricola 
Lepidostemon gouldii 
Lepidostemon pedunculosus 
Lepidostemon rosularis 
Lepidostemon williamsii

References

Brassicaceae
Brassicaceae genera